Robert Manuel Pipkins (August 17, 1907 – March 17, 1975), alternately spelled "Pipkin", and nicknamed "Diamond" or "Black Diamond", was an American Negro league pitcher between 1929 and 1942.

A native of Adams County, Mississippi, Pipkins made his Negro leagues debut in 1929 for the Birmingham Black Barons. He went on to play for the Cleveland Cubs in 1931, and finished his career back with Birmingham in 1942. Pipkins died in New Orleans, Louisiana in 1975 at age 67.

References

External links
 and Seamheads

1907 births
1975 deaths
Birmingham Black Barons players
Cleveland Cubs players
20th-century African-American sportspeople
Baseball pitchers